The United Nations Declaration on the Rights of Indigenous Peoples Act (also known as Bill C-15) is a law enacted by the Parliament of Canada and introduced during the second session of the 43rd Canadian Parliament in 2020. The legislation establishes a legal framework and timeline to bring Canadian law into alignment with the United Nations' Declaration on the Rights of Indigenous Peoples (UNDRIP).

The bill requires the federal government to ensure Canadian law is consistent with the declaration's 46 articles, working with First Nations, Métis, and Inuit peoples. A key element is requiring free, prior and informed consent (FPIC) with the Indigenous peoples. It also requires an action plan within two years of its passage to achieve the declaration's objectives, and an annual report on progress made.

The legislation is part of the government's response to a recommendation from the Truth and Reconciliation Commission (TRC) to adopt and implement UNDRIP as the framework for reconciliation. It also responds to the National Inquiry into Missing and Murdered Indigenous Women and Girls (MMIWG).

The Assembly of First Nations Chief Perry Bellegarde, noted that while the bill was not perfect, welcomed and supported the legislation.

The bill had the support of 37 Indigenous Nations and governments and other organizations, and 125 human rights advocates.

History

Canada and the UNDRIP
UNDRIP was passed by the UN General Assembly in 2007, with Canada voting against it under a Conservative government. In November 2010, the Conservative government publicly reversed its position, asserting its support for the declaration as an "aspirational document" In May 2016, Crown-Indigenous Relations Minister Carolyn Bennett officially removed Canada's objector status to UNDRIP at the United Nations.

Roméo Saganash's failed Bill C-262
Bill C-262 was introduced on April 21, 2016 as a private member's bill by NDP MP Roméo Saganash to implement the UN's resolution. Although Prime Minister Trudeau had campaigned in 2015 on the promise to implement the declaration, the Liberal government was not initially supportive, publicly declaring its implementation into Canadian law as "unworkable." In November 2016, however, the government reversed this position, endorsing Bill-262. Nevertheless, Bill C-262 "died on the order paper" in the senate during a Conservative filibuster.

Bill C-15
In December 2019, the Liberal Party of Canada's throne speech following the 2019 federal election promised to implement UNDRIP within a year of its new mandate. The tabling of the bill was postponed in early 2020 due to the rail blockade crisis.

On December 3, 2020, Minister of Justice David Lametti introduced the bill to the House of Commons where it passed its first reading. It used the former Bill C-262 as a starting point, adding new language, provisions, and a purpose clause in collaboration with Assembly of First Nations, Inuit Tapiriit Kanatami and the Métis National Council.

On February 17, 2021 Minister of Justice David Lametti moved that the bill be read the second time at the House of Commons and referred to parliamentary committee. By April 19, the house voted in favour of a second reading and be referred to committee.

On March 9, 2021 an open letter by the Grand Council of the Crees (Eeyou Istchee) in support of the bill was published in The Hill Times, urging its passage into law before parliament's session concludes. The letter's full list of signatories comprises 37 Indigenous Nations, governments, and other organizations, as well as 125 human rights advocates.

On March 11, 2021 the Standing Committee on Indigenous and Northern Affairs (INAN) held its first meeting on the bill. Witnesses included former NDP MP Romeo Saganash, the author of the bill's predecessor, C-262.

On April 26, 2021 the INAN produced its committee report studying the bill with amendments. The adjustments included references to systemic racism, that doctrines of discovery and terra nullius are racist, and shortened the time limit for the action plan from three years to two.

On June 10, 2021 the Standing Senate Committee on Aboriginal Peoples, after the bill passed its first and second readings in the senate, released its report without any amendments but with observations. The senate passed the bill's third reading on June 16, 2021 without any amendment and received Royal Assent on June 21.

Criticism

Although the bill requires Free Prior and Informed Consent, it does not explicitly provide a definition. This caused concern from various groups, including politicians and Indigenous leaders. Without a clear definition, some feared it would allow individuals to veto developments that are in the national interest and others feared that without a veto it is not true consent.

Idle No More, an Indigenous rights organization, along with two other Indigenous groups rejected bill C-15 outright, asserting it is an attack on Indigenous sovereignty and self-determination. Russ Diabo, a former advisor to two national chiefs at the Assembly of First Nations, described the bill as, "the Prime Minister [...] attempting his own version of the White Paper". Diabo criticized the bill's lack of Indigenous consultation, claiming it uses language designed to mislead Indigenous people, and that the, "UN declaration will be interpreted and implemented through the colonial Canadian constitutional framework, instead of respecting international law regarding the rights of Indigenous Peoples".

See also
CARE Principles for Indigenous Data Governance

Notes

References

43rd Canadian Parliament
Canadian federal legislation
Indigenous politics in Canada
Truth and Reconciliation Commission of Canada
Missing and Murdered Indigenous Women and Girls movement